WCLX (102.9 FM) is a radio station owned by Sun Signals LLC located in Westport, New York, United States, serving the Champlain Valley region of central Vermont and the Burlington, Vermont market. WCLX programs Adult Alternative hit music.

History
The station was granted the call letters WVZP on September 2, 1992; on October 1, the call letters were changed to WADQ (for "Adirondack"). The station signed on in January 1995. On September 16, 1996, the station took on the call sign WMEX; during this time, the station had a classical music format, with the slogan "Where classic call letters mean great Classical Music." In the late 1990s, WMEX gradually morphed into Burlington's Album Station, adopting the present call letters on February 10, 1999 when owner Dennis Jackson relinquished the historic "WMEX" call letters to Boston's 1060 AM.

References

External links

CLX
CLX
Radio stations established in 1995
1995 establishments in New York (state)
Adult album alternative radio stations in the United States